The Xiamen International Stone Fair is an annual trade show for the stone industry. The exhibition takes place March 6-9 every year in Xiamen, China. With 2,000 exhibitors from over 50 countries and 150,000 visitors from 155 countries, the Xiamen Stone Fair is one of the most influential in the industry.

Visitors 
The majority of visitors are from Asia while approximately one-third of visitors are from North America, Europe, and Oceania in 2016.

Exhibitors 
Over half of exhibitors are from outside China, with Turkey, Italy, Brazil, India, and Egypt representing more than half of all the international companies. Total exhibition space is 180,000 sq. m. (~2 million sq. ft.).

Exhibit Range 

 Raw Blocks: granite, marble, limestone, sandstone, slate, volcanic, artificial stone
 Stone Products: countertops, sculpture, furniture, tombstones, landscape, mosaic
 Machines and Tools: mining, processing, diamond tool, IT products
 Stone Conservation: abrasive, cleaning, care, binding, colorant
 Service, Trade Press, and Associations

Xiamen & the stone industry 
The city of Xiamen has over 12,000 stone processing factories in its neighboring area. 60% of Chinese and 15% of global stone trading volume is a direct result of the local stone industry activity in Xiamen.

World Stone Congress 
Concurrent with the Xiamen Stone Fair is the World Stone Congress, a series of 40 seminars and educational sessions. Among the most influential of these is the Global Master Architects Forum which was presented by Sou Fujimoto in 2016.

MIA+BSI 
The stone industry organization, MIA+BSI, attended the 2016 edition of the Xiamen Stone Fair. Jim Heib, is the CEO of MIA+BSI. A delegation of 30 members is organized by MIA+BSI to join the 2017 edition.

References 

Trade fairs in China
Spring (season) events in China